The Mulagori, also spelled Mullagori and  Mallagori, is sub section of Momand Pashtun Ghoryakhel confederacy. Predominantly, Mullagori live in the Mula Gori Tehsil of Khyber Agency District in the Province of Khyber Pakhtunkhwa, Pakistan, in the (Mohmand District, TEHSIL PRANG GHAR) and in Nangarhar Province, Afghanistan.

Origins
The Mulagori are believed to be one of the bravest tribes descended from Ghoryakhel. They were considered to be the fighters tribe of Pushtuns during the British rule in East India.  They settled just north of the Khyber Pass during the time when Islam was brought to South Asia.

They hold to a tradition that when Muhammad of Ghor was killed by enemies, some of his family members came to the hills of Tatara in the Khyber Agency and laid the foundations for a village named Bara Dara. They felt safe there; at that time the hills were deeply forested, protecting them from enemies.  In addition, the forests provided wild fruits and vegetables sufficient for their survival.

The name Mulagori is derived from mulla (religious leader) and Ghori (from Muhammad of Ghor).  British colonial governmental records misspelled the word Ghori as Gori. In his book, The Pathan Borderland, James W. Spain believes the Mulagori to be the descendants of the Mulla Ghor (son of Ba-Yazid Ansari, the Pir Rokhan of the Pakhtuns, and Pir Tarik of the Mughals). The Pashtun historian Bahadur Shah Zafar Kaka Khel, in his book Pukhtana da Tarikh pa Ranra key, is of the opinion that the Mulagori are a subgroup of the Mohmand tribe.

Abdul Latif Yaad in his book Pukhtane Qabile writes that Mulagori are basically a part of Mohmands. He tells a story that once few persons in Mohmands went somewhere. One of them was a mullah he separated from them. One of the group members told that Mulla Gorai and after that, the person was known as Mullagoray. He adds that according to Famous Pashto Poet, Hamza Shinwari said Mulagoris are behaving and talking like Mohmands so they are basically a part of the Mohmands.

However, some oral sources has further clarified the situation about Mulagori's origin. They opine that Mulagori are in fact a section of Dawezai Momands. In the Dawezai area in Momand Agency, more than 600 Mulagori families still reside. On the basis of this, Mulagori are Mohmand / Momand, and in Momands belongs to Dawezai sub-section. Everywhere Mulagori resides near Momands, and in most cases are in matrimonial relations with them. Historically, Mulagori have remained in a very cordial relations with the other sections of Momands, and have supported each other's causes, in case of tribal wars with other tribes like Afridis etc.

Sub-tribes
The forefather of the Mulagori was said to have had four sons, and each son fathered a sub-section of the Mulagori tribe. The four sub-tribes are named for the sons:
Pahar Khel
Taar Khel
Daulat Khel 
Ahmed Khel
AND THREE SUB TRIBES OF MOHMAND AGENCY
 AMEER KHAN KHEL 
 MANDE HKHEL
 BAME KHEL

Some other sub-tribes were also came into existence like:
Miankhel
Chamyar Khel (In Shakoor)
 Ara Khel (In Pir Sado)
 Ali Khan Khel (Pir Sado)
 Bayan Khel (Afghanistan)

Employment
There are about 250 marble factories in the area, which employ not only Mallagori tribesmen but also the residents of nearby villages.

Education
The Mulagori are underserved in schools built by the Pakistani government. In a population of about 60,000, there is no middle (or high school) for girls and no college for boys. While the Pakistani government built a high school for Mulagori boys in 1975, there is no middle school for girls in the Mulagori area of the Khyber Agency and MOHMAND AGENCY. Although the Frontier Corps has opened a cadet college in the Mulagori area, despite promises no seats are given to Mulagori students. Former governor Iftikhar Hussain Shah promised to build a Higher Secondary School for Mallagori students when he visited Jamrud. Work begun on Lowara Mina High School; after six rooms were built, the government withdrew its support for the remainder of the project.

References

RESEARCH
SAJID ALI SAJID8  MULAGORI
https://www.youtube.com/watch?v=OuC-Z0bmIrQ

Sarbani Pashtun tribes
Social groups of Pakistan